The Gerard P. Kuiper Prize is awarded annually by the Division for Planetary Sciences of the American Astronomical Society for outstanding lifetime achievement in the field of planetary science.  The prize is named for Gerard P. Kuiper.

Kuiper Prize winners
Source: Gerard P. Kuiper Prize, American Astronomical Society

See also

 List of astronomy awards

References

External links
 Gerard P. Kuiper Prize

Astronomy prizes
Gerard Kuiper
American Astronomical Society